Ama Girls is a 1958 American short documentary film produced by Ben Sharpsteen. It was part of Disney's People & Places series. It won an Oscar at the 31st Academy Awards in 1959 for Documentary Short Subject. It is also known as Japan Harvests the Sea. It depicts the lives of ama divers, Japanese women who dive for pearls.

References

External links

1958 films
1958 documentary films
1950s American films
1950s English-language films
1950s short documentary films
Best Documentary Short Subject Academy Award winners
CinemaScope films
Disney documentary films
Disney short films
Documentary films about underwater diving
Films produced by Ben Sharpsteen
Films produced by Walt Disney
Films set in Japan
Fishing industry in Japan